Petr Záhrobský (born 30 November 1980, in Jilemnice) is an alpine skier from Czech Republic.  He competed for Czech Republic at the 2002 Olympics, 2006 Olympics and the 2010 Olympics.  His best result was 24th in the Super-G in the 2002 Olympics.

References

External links
 
 

1980 births
Living people
Czech male alpine skiers
Olympic alpine skiers of the Czech Republic
Alpine skiers at the 2002 Winter Olympics
Alpine skiers at the 2006 Winter Olympics
Alpine skiers at the 2010 Winter Olympics
Universiade medalists in alpine skiing
Universiade gold medalists for the Czech Republic
Competitors at the 2007 Winter Universiade
People from Jilemnice
Sportspeople from the Liberec Region